Hemiconus granularis is an extinct species of sea snail, a marine gastropod mollusk, in the family Conidae, the cone snails and their allies.

References

 Lozouet P. (2017). Les Conoidea de l'Oligocène supérieur (Chattien) du bassin de l'Adour (Sud-Ouest de la France). Cossmanniana. 19: 3–180.

granularis
Gastropods described in 1820